Iati is a city located in the state of Pernambuco, Brazil. It has an estimated population of 19,241 inhabitants.

Geography
 State - Pernambuco
 Region - Agreste Pernambucano
 Boundaries - Saloá (North); Alagoas state (South); Saloá and Bom Conselho (East); Águas Belas (West).
 Area - 635.14 km2
 Elevation - 487 m
 Hydrography - Ipanema River
 Vegetation - Caatinga hiperxerófila
 Climate - Semi arid hot
 Annual average temperature - 24.2 c
 Distance to Recife - 286 km

Economy
The main economic activities in Iati are in agribusiness, especially  beans, manioc, corn; and livestock such as cattle, sheep, goats, pigs and poultry.

Economic indicators

Economy by Sector
2006

Health indicators

References

Municipalities in Pernambuco